Bozman may refer to:

Bozman, Maryland, location in the United States
Ernest Franklin Bozman (1895–1968), British author
Ellen M. Bozman (1925–2009), American community activist and politician
Ron Bozman, American film producer

See also
Bozeman (disambiguation)